Kamala Nehru College is located at the August Kranti Marg, New Delhi. It was established in the year 1964 and is affiliated to University of Delhi. Kamala Nehru College Delhi University carries an ‘A’ Grade and is one of the most prestigious all-girls colleges of Delhi University, as accredited by National Assessment and Accreditation Council (NAAC). Kamala Nehru College is recognized for its excellent infrastructure which is tallied amongst the best in the University. Kamala Nehru College is among the top 24 Arts colleges affiliated with the University of Delhi (2022 with Rankings) with other prestigious colleges of Delhi University such as Miranda House, Hindu College, Kirori Mal College, and so on.

History

Kamala Nehru college was founded in 1964 by Dr KK Gorowara, as Government College for Women and was located in Defence Colony, New Delhi. In the year 1966 the college was renamed 'Modern College for Women'. Later in 1974 the college was renamed after the freedom fighter, wife of Jawaharlal Nehru, Kamala Nehru, and finally christened Kamala Nehru College. It was then shifted to its present location on August Kranti Marg New Delhi.

When the college was started it just had 16 staff members and 209 students passed out in the first batch in 1968. The College Magazine ‘Swati’ was launched in the academic year 1965–66. Further in 1966–67, the college was renamed as ‘Modern College for Women’ and in 1967-68 the College Magazine acquired a new name ‘Apoorva’. On 21 November 1972, the foundation stone for a new building was laid at Hauz Khas (at present August Kranti Marg) by then President Shri V.V.Giri. The college was given a new name and it became Kamala Nehru College.  In 1974, on the occasion of Founder's Day, Mrs. Indira Gandhi visited the new building, unveiled the plaque and planted saplings.

The college has a beautiful auditorium which was built through sincere contribution made by the staff and students through fund raising campaigns. It was inaugurated on 17 December 1991 by the then Vice-president Dr.Shankar Dayal Sharma. Today the college has well maintained sports grounds, computer labs, gymnasium and eco-friendly classrooms (bamboo rooms apart from the main building). The library is well stacked and has a separate audio visual section. The college is physically challenged friendly and is under constant CCTV surveillance. The Placement Cell, NSS, NSO, NCC, Counselling Cell function for the overall wellbeing of the students. Kamala Nehru College has several extra-curricular societies that cover the whole gamut of personality development aspects by providing plural avenues to students for self-discovery. All departments and the societies have their annual newsletters/magazines and the college comes up with its journal ‘Akademos’(An Annual Miscellany of Liberal Arts and Scholarship, ISSN 2231-0584) each year.

Academics

Academic programmes 
The college offers various programmes such as undergraduate, postgraduate and add-on courses under the aegis of Delhi University. They are listed below-

Undergraduate
 Bachelor of Arts (B.A.) HONS in Economics, English, Geography, Hindi, History, Journalism, Mathematics, Philosophy, Political Science, Psychology, Sanskrit and Sociology.
 Bachelor of Arts (B.A.) programme in Bengali, Economics, English, Geography, Hindi, History, Mathematics, Philosophy, Political Science, Punjabi, Sanskrit, Sociology and Advertisement Sales Management and Sales Promotion.
 Bachelor of Commerce (B.Com.) Honors
 Bachelor of Commerce (B.Com.) pass

Postgraduate
Master of Arts (M.A) in English, Hindi, History, Political Science, Philosophy, Sanskrit and Assamese.

Add-On courses
 French language course (certificate,diploma and advanced diploma)
 A Certificate Course on Ecotourism

Rankings
It is ranked 33rd across India by National Institutional Ranking Framework in 2020.

Placement Cell
The Placement Cell at Kamala Nehru College was instituted in 2006 and since its inception, it has been an integral part of the college. The college has provided complete infrastructure for the effective functioning of the cell. Top companies like EY, KPMG, and Wipro recruit students through on-campus placement.

The Placement Cell serves as an interface between the students and the Corporates. Apart from bringing a varied list of Recruiters to the campus, the Placement Cell also organizes talks, study abroad seminars, internship opportunities and workshops for the collective student body.

The aim is to ensure that students have the information and skills necessary for an effective job search.
To conduct professional training programs outside the curricula to provide better placements.
Arranging preparatory programmers’ such as seminars, group discussions, written tests/interviews (mock), confidence building and personality development sessions, the general awareness courses, etc. by experts in their respective fields for students to gauge and handle challenging aspects in their prescribed work sphere
Internships are also offered to those students who are keen on experiencing a slice of workplace life.
Acts as a link between students, alumni, and the workplace.
To organize campus interviews for final year students with industries and business houses of repute from all over India.
To prepare students to face campus interviews by arranging training in Aptitude tests, group discussions, preparing for Technical and HR interviews through professional trainers and alumni.
To promote career counseling by organizing guidance lectures by senior corporate personnel and most importantly by the immediately placed senior students.
Placement Cell has also been active on social media providing the students with a quick and easy interface to browse through and apply to their preferred internships and placements opportunities.

References

External links
 Official College website

Delhi University
1964 establishments in Delhi
Memorials to Kamala Nehru
Educational institutions established in 1964